The valley papilla-tongued frog (Liurana vallecula) is a frog in the family Ceratobatrachidae endemic to Tibet. Scientists know it exclusively from the type locality in Medog County. Scientists have seen it 550 meters above sea level.

Appearance

The adult frog measures 14.6 to 20.4 mm in snout-vent length.  The skin of the dorsum is red-brown in color.  This frog has a white belly with dark spots or mottling.  There are dark bars across the legs and no webbed skin on any of the feet.

Threats

This frog lives in Medog County, which has been subject to cosniderable human-induced habitat loss.

Etymology

Scientists named this frog vallecula in Latin for "valley-dwelling."  They also named it He Gu She Tu Wa (河谷舌突蛙) in Chinese and valley papilla-tongued frog in English.

References

vallecula
Frogs of Asia
Endemic fauna of Tibet
Amphibians described in 2019